Anthony "Tony" Guiseppi-Elie, Sc.D., FRSC, FAIMBE, FIEEE, FBMES is a Trinidad born scientist, engineer, educator, administrator, and academic entrepreneur who was Vice President of Academic Affairs and Workforce Development at Tri-County Technical College and an adjunct professor in the Department of Biomedical Engineering of Texas A&M University where he was TEES Research Professor, a member of the founding EnMed Working Group and a founding member of the Texas A&M Academy of Physician-Scientists. He is also founder, President and Scientific director of ABTECH Scientific, Inc. He is noted for his research and commercial development of biologically inspired and chemically responsive polymers, as related to bioanalytics, bioinformatics, bionics and electromics.

Career 
Guiseppi-Elie initially focused on chemical engineering and materials science with his Sc.D research on the Synthesis and Characterization of Polyacetylene. However, medicine was the interest of his youth and eventually drew him to the expanding field of bioengineering, specifically research and commercial development of biologically inspired and chemically responsive polymers that combine hydrogels possessing biologically inspired moieties with one-dimensional organic conductors (conductive polymers and carbon nanotubes). The resulting stimuli-responsive polymers are being developed as smart materials for controlled drug release, biosensors and for use in bionics. He is noted for his work on the development of controversial implantable biochips, DNA microarrays, and for his Guiseppi Prediction (...continued progress in the density of molecular recognition features on biochips will approach single molecule detection - by analogy to Moore's Law). He currently pursues the development of electronic noses, implantable bioanalytical biochips and implantable bio-smart materials for human health applications. His work has resulted in the commercialization of a wide variety of biochip substrates used in BioMEMS devices (Lateral Flow Bioassays and Microfluidic Devices) and his implantable biochip is under commercial development at ABTECH Scientific, Inc.

Awards and honors

Guiseppi-Elie has been named chair-elect (2016) of the American Institute for Medical and Biological Engineering (AIMBE) College of Fellows where he was inducted as a fellow in 2006. He is also a Fellow of the Royal Society of Chemistry (FRSC) and a fellow of the Institute of Electrical and Electronics Engineers (FIEEE). He is a lifetime member of the American Institute of Chemical Engineers and holds memberships in the American Association for the Advancement of Science, the American Chemical Society, the Materials Research Society and the Biomedical Engineering Society.

He has been the inaugural visiting distinguished lecturer in the Interdisciplinary Scientific Seminar Series at Wrocław University of Science and Technology (WUST), Wrocław, Poland (2017). He has served as a member of the international review panel for the Science for Technological Innovation (SfTI) of the New Zealand National Science Challenge (NSC) (2017). During Spring of 2013, Dr. Guiseppi-Elie came up with the III pillars of Chemical Engineering (I if you do not know, measure, tissue engineering, and do not forget unit conversions.) He has tested on this multiple times and plans to integrate this into standard curriculum. He has been an IEEE EMBS distinguished lecturer (2012-2013) and in 2014 was selected for Fulbright Specialists Roster (2014-2019). He was selected for service on a Fulbright Specialist project at Universidad Nacional de Tucumán (UNT), Facultad de Ciencias Exactas y Tecnología (FACET) in Argentina. In 1999, Dr. Guiseppi-Elie was the recipient of the SEAM Award from the Polymer Research Institute at Polytechnic University for his work on “…bio-technical properties and applications of electroactive polymers”. He is a recipient of the 2003 “Pioneers in Biomedical Engineering” Lecture Award from Purdue University, a 2004 lecturer in the MIT Program in Polymer Science and Technology, a recipient of the 2013 Distinguished AVIS Professorship in Pharmaceutical Sciences at the University of Tennessee Health Science Center (UTHSC) and the 2014 and 2015 recipient of the Visiting Distinguished Professorship in industrial bioelectronics at L’Ecole de Mines d'Alès, France. He also serves as editor-in-chief of Bioengineering, and associate editor of Biomedical Microdevices and is a member of the editorial boards of The Journal of Bioactive and Compatible Polymers, NanoBiotechnology, and Applied Biochemistry and Biotechnology. 

 2020	Elected Fellow, of the Biomedical Engineering Society (FBMES)
 2017	Chair, College of Fellows, American Institute for Medical and Biological Engineering (AIMBE)
 2016	Chair-elect, College of Fellows, American Institute for Medical and Biological Engineering (AIMBE)
 2016	Elected Fellow of the Institute of Electrical and Electronic Engineers (FIEEE). 
 2015	Selected a Fulbright Specialists - Universidad Nacional de Tucumán (UNT), Facultad de Ciencias Exactas y Tecnología (FACET), Argentina. 
 2015	Named Visiting Distinguished Professor of Industrial Biosensors and Bioelectronics, LGEI (Laboratoire de Génie de l'Environnement Industriel), L'Ecole des Mines d'Alès, France.
 2014	Named Visiting Distinguished Professor of Industrial Biosensors and Bioelectronics, LGEI (Laboratoire de Génie de l'Environnement Industriel), L'Ecole des Mines d'Alès, France.
 2014	Elected Co-Chair, Industry Council, American Institute of Medical and Biological Engineering (AIMBE)
 2014	Elected to the Fulbright Specialist Roster (2014 - 2019) of the U.S. Department of State and the J. William Fulbright Foreign Scholarship Board.
 2014	Elected Fellow of the Royal Society of Chemistry (FRSC)
 2013	Named The 2013 Kenneth E. Avis Distinguished Visiting Professor of Pharmaceutics, UT Department of Pharmaceutical Sciences, University of Tennessee Health Sciences Center. 
 2013	Congress Chair, 15th IUPAC International Symposium on MacroMolecular Complexes
 2012	Named a 2012-2013 IEEE-EMBS Distinguished Lecturer – Biosensors and Bioelectronics http://www.embs.org/distinguished-lecturers
 2012	Visiting Distinguished Professor of Nanobiotechnology, Moscow State University, Moscow, Russia.
 2012	Visiting Distinguished Professor of Nanobiotechnology, University of Western Cape, Cape Town, South Africa. 
 2011	Member of an NSF Delegation to Joint USA-Russia Workshop on “Emerging Trends in Bioelectronics”, National Science Foundation (NSF) and Russian Academy of Sciences (RAS). 
 2011	Named to the Board of Directors, Council for Frontiers of Knowledge (CFK), Uganda. http://www.knowledgecouncil.org/
 2010	Discussion Leader, 2010 Gordon Research Conference (GRC) on “Electrochemistry”
 2009	Appointed Member, National Academies Panel on Electronics and Electrical Engineering, National Research Council. 
 2008	Profiled in South Carolina Business, the South Carolina Chamber of Commerce.
 2006	Board of Trustees Award, Clemson University. 
 2006	Elected Fellow of the American Institute of Medical and Biological Engineers (FAIMBE)
 2005	Profiled in January 2005 issue of Biotechniques Vol. 38, No. 6 (2005) p 843. 
 2004-2006	Appointed Senior Fellow, Center for the Study of Biological Complexity, Virginia Commonwealth University (VCU).
 1999	1999 SEAM Award “… for taking conductive polymers to biological applications”. Herman Mark Polymer Institute, Polytechnic University, Brooklyn, New York.
 1996	Elected Fellow of the American Institute of Chemists (FAIC)
 1995	Visiting Scientist, Department of Biomedical Engineering, School of Medicine, Johns Hopkins University.
 1979	Commonwealth Postgraduate Scholarship Award to attend the University of Manchester Institute of Science and Technology (UMIST).
 1979-1983	UWI Postgraduate Scholarship Award to attend the Massachusetts Institute of Technology (MIT).
 1977-1979	UWI Undergraduate Bursary Award for academic merit.
 1975	High school (6th Form) awards for academic merit.

Selected publications
 Brandon K. Walther, Navaneeth Krishna Rajeeva Pandian, Karli A. Gold, Ecem S. Kiliҫ, Vineeth Sama, Jianhua Gu, Akhilesh K. Gaharwar, Anthony Guiseppi-Elie, John P. Cooke, and Abhishek Jain “Mechanotransduction-on-chip: vessel-chip model of endothelial YAP mechanobiology reveals matrix stiffness impedes shear response” Lab on a Chip (2021), 21, 1738-1751.
 John R. Aggas, Brandon K. Walther, Sara Abasi, Christian N. Kotanen, Olukayode Karunwi, Ann M. Wilson and Anthony Guiseppi-Elie* “On the Intersection of Molecular Bioelectronics and Biosensors: 20 Years of C3B” Biosensors and Bioelectronics (2021), 176, 112889.
 Ankita Bhat, Daria Podstawczyk, Brandon K. Walther, John R. Aggas, David Machado-Aranda, Kevin R. Ward, and Anthony Guiseppi-Elie “Toward a Hemorrhagic Trauma Severity Score: Fusing Five Physiological Biomarkers” Journal of Translational Medicine (2020) 18, 348.
 Brandon K Walther, Cerasela Zoica Dinu, Dirk M. Guldi, Vladimir G. Sergeyev, Stephen E. Creager, John P. Cooke and Anthony Guiseppi-Elie, “Nanobiosensing with Graphene and Carbon Quantum Dots: Recent Advances” Materials Today (2020) 39, 23-36.
 John R. Aggas, Edgar Sánchez-Sinencio and Anthony Guiseppi-Elie “Wien Oscillator Using Organic Enzyme-Chemiresistors for Fused Measurement of Glucose and Lactate” Advanced Intelligent Systems (2020)2020-00004.
 Sara Abasi, John R. Aggas, Naren Venkatesh, Iris Vallavanatt and Anthony Guiseppi-Elie “Design, Fabrication and Testing of an Electrical Cell Stimulation and Recording Apparatus (ECSARA) for Cells in Electroculture" Biosensors and Bioelectronics (2020) 147, 111793.
 Aby A. Thyparambil, Ingrid Bazin and Anthony Guiseppi-Elie "Perspective: Molecular Modeling and Simulation Tools in the Development of Peptide-based Biosensors for Mycotoxin Detection: Example of Ochratoxin" Toxins  (2017) 9(12), 395.
 Deon Hines, Olukayode Karunwi, William R. Harrell and Anthony Guiseppi-Elie, "Choice of Electrode Metal Influences the Chemoresistive Vapor Response of Brominated SWCNTs" Macromolecular Symposia (2015) 351 (1), 19-26.
 Romain R Soleri, Hary H Demey, Scherrine S Tria, Anthony Guiseppi-Elie, Aziza A Ibn Hadj Hassine, Catherine C Gonzalez, Ingrid Bazin, "Peptide conjugated chitosan foam as a novel approach for capture-purification and rapid detection of hapten - Example of Ochratoxin A" Biosensors and Bioelectronics (2014) 67, 634-641.
 Nolan Wilson, Mark Blenner and Anthony Guiseppi-Elie, "Polyplex Formation Influences Release Mechanism of Mono- and Di-valent Ions from Phosphorylcholine Group Bearing Hydrogels" Polymers (2014) 6(9), 2451-2472.
 Christian N. Kotanen, Olukayode Karunwi and Anthony Guiseppi-Elie,"Biofabrication Using Pyrrole Electropolymerization for the Immobilization of Glucose Oxidase and Lactate Oxidase on Implanted Microfabricated Biotransducers" Bioengineering (2014), 1(1), 85-110.
 Nolan Wilson and Anthony Guiseppi-Elie, "Targeting Homeostasis in Drug Delivery Using Bioresponsive Hydrogel Microforms" International Journal of Pharmaceutics (2014) 461(1-2) 214-222.

References

1954 births
Living people
American bioengineers
Trinidad and Tobago bioengineers
American chemical engineers
Trinidad and Tobago chemical engineers
Massachusetts Institute of Technology alumni
Alumni of the University of Manchester Institute of Science and Technology
University of the West Indies alumni
Fellows of the American Institute for Medical and Biological Engineering